Danny Madden is an American R&B singer, who was signed to the record label Giant Records in the 1990s. He scored his only chart hit  with the single "Facts of Life," which peaked at number #91 on the US Billboard R&B chart. It reached #72 in the UK Singles Chart. It was featured on the New Jack City soundtrack. His debut album These Are the Facts of Life was released in 1991.

References

Year of birth missing (living people)
Living people
American contemporary R&B singers